Vitjazinella is a genus of sea snails, marine gastropod mollusks in the family Raphitomidae.

Species
 Vitjazinella multicostata Sysoev, 1988

References

 Sysoev, AV. "Ultra-abyssal Findings of Mollusks of the Family Turridae (Gastropoda, Toxoglossa) in the Pacific Ocean" Zoologichesky Zhurnal 67.8 (1988): p. 1122

External links
 
 Worldwide Mollusc Species Data Base: Mangeliidae
 Bouchet, P.; Kantor, Y. I.; Sysoev, A.; Puillandre, N. (2011). A new operational classification of the Conoidea (Gastropoda). Journal of Molluscan Studies. 77(3): 273-308
 Abdelkrim J., Aznar-Cormano L., Fedosov A., Kantor Y., Lozouet P., Phuong M., Zaharias P. & Puillandre N. (2018). Exon-capture based phylogeny and diversification of the venomous gastropods (Neogastropoda, Conoidea). Molecular Biology and Evolution. 35(10): 2355-2374

 
Gastropod genera